The Quiet Offspring is the fourth full-length studio album by the Norwegian progressive metal band Green Carnation. It was released on 22 February 2005.

Background 
In this recording, the band breaks away from their previous offerings. Although critically acclaimed and well accepted by fans, The Quiet Offspring has a more traditional rock sound and leaves behind much of the progressiveness and atmospheric feels of the band's previous albums, Light of Day, Day of Darkness and A Blessing in Disguise. Some listeners have criticized this transition, while others claim it would have been inconceivable to repeat the feat of the sixty-minute album.

Track listing
 "The Quiet Offspring" – 4:05 (Sordal)
 "Between the Gentle Small and the Standing Tall" – 4:15 (Tchort, Sordal)
 "Just When You Think It's Safe" – 5:18 (Tchort)
 "A Place for Me" – 5:26 (Krumins)
 "The Everlasting Moment" – 5:09 (Sordal)
 "Purple Door, Pitch Black" – 4:12 (Sordal)
 "Childsplay - Part I" – 4:47 (Tchort)
 "Dead But Dreaming" – 5:26 (Tchort)
 "Pile of Doubt" – 5:56 (Sordal)
 "When I Was You" – 7:22 (Nordhus)
 "Childsplay - Part II" – 4:23 (Tchort, Moen)

Personnel
Green Carnation
 Kjetil Nordhus – vocals 
 Terje Vik Schei (a.k.a. Tchort) – guitars
 Michael Krumins – guitars 
 Stein Roger Sordal – bass guitar, guitars 
 Kenneth Silden – keyboards 
 Anders Kobro – drums

Guest musicians
 Bernt Moen – keyboards, piano on "Childsplay Part I" and "Childsplay Part II"

References

External links
 Interview with Kjetil Nordhus concerning The Quiet Offspring

Green Carnation albums
2005 albums
The End Records albums
Season of Mist albums